Mouhamed Ameur (born 6 January 1932) is a French former long-distance runner who competed in the 1960 Summer Olympics. He was born in Algeria.

References

External links
 

1932 births
Possibly living people
Olympic athletes of France
Athletes (track and field) at the 1960 Summer Olympics
French male long-distance runners
French sportspeople of Algerian descent
Mediterranean Games gold medalists for France
Athletes (track and field) at the 1959 Mediterranean Games
Mediterranean Games medalists in athletics
20th-century French people